George Ferris may refer to:

George Ferris (cricketer) (born 1964), former cricketer for the Leeward Islands and Leicestershire
George Washington Gale Ferris Jr. (1859–1896), American inventor of the Ferris wheel
George Ashmead Ferris (1859–1958), American architect
George A. Ferris & Son, an architectural firm in Reno, Nevada
George M. Ferris (1893–1992), American investment banker and philanthropist
George M. Ferris Jr. (1927–2008), American investment banker and philanthropist